Nevado Queva or Quewar is a volcano in the Andes mountain range of South America, located in the Salta Province of Argentina. Its name is alternately spelled Quehuar. There are extensive pre Columbian ruins on the summit of the mountain, which is a broad crater.

It is the highest of Nevados de los Pastos Grandes and its territory is within the Argentinean protection area of Provincial Fauna Reserve Los Andes. It is located within the territory of the Argentinean province of Salta. Its slopes are within the administrative boundaries of the Argentinean city of San Antonio de los Cobres.

First Ascent 
Quewar was climbed by the Incas and evidence of such ascents is currently found on the summit in the form of a 80 square metre platform found for the first time in 1974 by Antonio Beorchia Nigris. The first recorded modern was by Julio Oscar Ramirez (Argentina) 22 May 1954.

Elevation 
Other data from available digital elevation models: SRTM yields 6136 metres, ASTER 6105 metres and TanDEM-X 6177 metres. The height of the nearest key col is 4506 meters, leading to a topographic prominence of 1644 meters. Quewar is considered a Mountain Range according to the Dominance System  and its dominance is 26.73%. Its parent peak is Nevado de Cachi and the Topographic isolation is 77.4 kilometers.

See also

 List of mountains in the Andes
 List of Ultras of South America
 Nevados de Pastos Grandes
 List of Andean peaks with known pre-Columbian ascents

References

External links

 "Queva, Argentina" on Peakbagger

Mountains of Argentina
Volcanoes of Salta Province
Six-thousanders of the Andes